Mae-Hia is a town and subdistrict in Mueang Chiang Mai District, in Chiang Mai Province, Thailand. As of 2014 the subdistrict and thus the town has a population of 18,546 people.

History
 1995: Mae Hia subdistrict administrative organization was established as the local government for the whole subdistrict. 
 2007: The organization was upgraded to a subdistrict-municipality (thesaban tambon). 
 2011: The organization was upgraded to a town-municipality (thesaban mueang).

References

Populated places in Chiang Mai province
Cities and towns in Chiang Mai province